Steven Paul Crook (born 28 May 1983) is a former Australian cricketer who played for Northamptonshire in English county cricket. He is an all-rounder, batting right-handed and bowling right-arm fast medium pace. In September 2018, he announced his retirement from all forms of cricket.
Sir Alastair Cook described Steven as the worst bowler he had faced during the recent Tailenders Live show at the Palace Theatre Manchester #Tailendersoftheworlduniteandtakeover

Cricket career
Crook was born and brought up in Australia, of British parents. He holds a United Kingdom passport, so is not classified as an overseas player for the purposes of county cricket's overseas player restrictions. While he was playing league cricket in England, he caught the eye of Lancashire and was offered a contract. He made his County Championship debut in September 2003 versus Warwickshire, having previously played a first-class match against university opposition and two limited over county games.

Crook moved to Northamptonshire in 2005, and played for them until 2009. He left Northants in 2009, having been severely limited by injury; in his final season he was only able to play two first-class matches. He spent the 2010 season out of county cricket, playing for Brixworth in the Northamptonshire Cricket League, before signing for Middlesex the following year. He played two seasons for Middlesex, taking 44 wickets at an average of 30.59 in 16 first-class games.

In 2013 he returned to play for Northants. He scored his maiden first-class century in June 2014 against former club Middlesex, and has since scored four more. He has been to Twenty20 finals day three times, twice finishing on the winning team, in 2013 and 2016, and as runners-up in 2015.

Music career
Crook also fronts a band, Juliet the Sun, as lead vocalist. Tabloids told that they provided inspiration for England during the 2005 Ashes and even became brief tabloid darlings when it emerged that former team-mates James Anderson and Monty Panesar were blasting out their signature tune, "Time for Heroes", in the dressing room in between sessions.

Crook plays at the Cricketers Arms. in Northampton.

Personal life 
Crook is involved in supporting various charities including a 2015 £1 per run and more benefit for Lennox-Gastaut Syndrome (LGS)-sufferer, Lewis Herbert. Among those assisting have been Jimmy Anderson, Graeme Swann, The Cube Disability and many others. Besides Crook, The Cube sponsors Northants Steelbacks Mohammad Azharullah.

References

External links
 

1983 births
Living people
Australian cricketers
Northamptonshire cricketers
Lancashire cricketers
Middlesex cricketers
Cricketers from Adelaide